John de Brantingham (died before 1365) was an English Christian clergyman of the early 14th century and a member of the Brantingham family. He held a prebend of Derby Cathedral, value five marks a year, and the rectory of Askeby, worth 20 marks annually. In June 1318, Pope John XXII empowered de Brantingham to hold, in addition to his existing posts, the rectory of Huggate in the diocese of York, worth 40 pounds per annum. Later, de Brantingham also served as vicar of Otley in Yorkshire.
Clearly a prodigious clergyman, de Brantingham appeared at the Parliament of Carlisle in 1306/1307 as a proxy for the Archdeacon of Surrey and, later, as a substitute for Henry de Tychewell, who was a proxy for the archdeaconry of Surrey.

Personal life
In 1325, William Melton, Archbishop of York, granted to de Brantingham, then vicar of Otley, the wardship and marriage of Agnes, daughter and heir of John Malebrank of Farnley.

De Brantingham is also recorded as a witness to the grant by William Peyle to William Mariot of a half-acre of land in the territory of Sileby in the field called Suzerenemers, for 22 shillings; rent a rose a year.

References

Bibliography
.
.

.

14th-century deaths

Year of birth unknown

Year of death unknown
History of Derby

14th-century English people
English Christian religious leaders